Southmoor Apartment Hotel is a historic apartment hotel located at Hammond, Lake County, Indiana.  It was built in 1928, and is a five-story, "L"-plan building with a reinforced concrete frame and hollow tile exterior sheathed in brick and terra cotta.  The building is in the Spanish Colonial Revival style.

It was listed in the National Register of Historic Places in 2011.

References

Hammond, Indiana
Residential buildings on the National Register of Historic Places in Indiana
Mission Revival architecture in Indiana
Residential buildings completed in 1928
Buildings and structures in Lake County, Indiana
National Register of Historic Places in Lake County, Indiana